Gol Tappeh (also known as Kūl Tepe) is a city and capital of Gol Tappeh District, in Kabudarahang County, Hamadan Province, Iran. At the 2006 census, its population was 1,876, in 469 families. In the 2016 census conducted by the Republic of Iran, the total population recorded was 2,237, with 1,095 males and 1,142 females.

Goltapeh is also a village in Azerbaijan Province near Marageh city.

References

Kabudarahang County

Cities in Hamadan Province